The Sidney A. Hill House is a historic house at 31 Chestnut Street in Stoneham, Massachusetts.  The Queen Anne style Victorian wood-frame house was built c. 1895 for Sidney A. Hill, a partner in a shoe manufacturing business.  The gables of the house feature Stick-style aprons and bands of cut shingles, and a porch that wraps around parts of the front and side of the house that features turned balusters and posts, and more Stick style detailing.

The house was listed on the National Register of Historic Places in 1984, and included in the Nobility Hill Historic District in 1990.

See also
National Register of Historic Places listings in Stoneham, Massachusetts
National Register of Historic Places listings in Middlesex County, Massachusetts

References

Houses in Stoneham, Massachusetts
Houses on the National Register of Historic Places in Stoneham, Massachusetts
Queen Anne architecture in Massachusetts
Houses completed in 1895
Historic district contributing properties in Massachusetts